Frank Howard Atkins (1882–1921) was a British writer. He wrote more than 180 short stories in pulp magazines, most of which were published between 1908 and 1935 Most were published under the pen name F. St. Mars. Atkins' stories under the Mars pseudonym usually revolved around animals. The "F. St. Mars" stories appeared in
Pearson's Magazine, The Grand Magazine, The Novel Magazine, The Red Magazine, and Adventure in the United States.

His father was the British writer Francis Henry Atkins.

Bibliography

Caught by a Comet (1910) (as Fenton Ash)
The Way of the Wild (1919)

References

1882 births
1921 deaths
Pulp fiction writers